"Dime Cómo Quieres" (English: "Tell Me How You Want") is a song by Regional Mexican artists Christian Nodal and Ángela Aguilar, released on November 13, 2020. It was written by Nodal and Edgar Barrera. It reached number one on the Top 20 General Mexican Songs Chart and number eight on the Billboard Top Latin Songs chart in the United States.

Background 
Nodal said in an interview with Billboard magazine that he reached out to Aguilar in 2019 with song and she responded a few months later with her vocals on it.

Music video 
The music video was shot three months before the songs release. Nodal and Aguilar are seen together in the video, although they recorded their parts separately using a green screen.

Chart performance 
In Mexico, "Dime Cómo Quieres" debuted at number nine on the Mexico Top 20 General chart, eventually rising to number one. In the United States, the single entered Billboards Hot Latin Songs at number 9; the following week, it rose to its number eight peak. The song also peaked at number 1 on Billboard'''s Regional Mexican Songs. It entered the Billboard''s Bubbling Under Hot 100 chart on the week ending December 5, 2020, debuting at number 22. It was Nodal's third appearance on the chart and Aguilar's first.

Charts

Weekly charts

Year-end charts

Certifications

References

2020 songs
2020 singles
Mexican folk songs
Spanish-language songs
Ranchera songs
Universal Music Latin Entertainment singles
Christian Nodal songs
Songs written by Christian Nodal
Songs written by Edgar Barrera